or "the three mountains of Yamato", in Kashihara, Nara Prefecture, Japan, are , , and . Celebrated in Japanese poetry, they have been jointly designated a Place of Scenic Beauty. Jimmu, first Emperor of Japan, is said to have built his palace on the southeast side of Mt Unebi; he is enshrined at Kashihara Jingū. Archaeological study in the 1990s has shown that, rather than their surrounding Fujiwara-kyō on three sides, the "palace-city" was so large as to encompass the three mountains.

See also
 Monuments of Japan
 List of Special Places of Scenic Beauty, Special Historic Sites and Special Natural Monuments
 Meisho
 Utamakura
 Kunimi (practice)

References

Mountains of Nara Prefecture
Places of Scenic Beauty